"One of These Days" is a song co-written and originally recorded by the American country music singer Marcus Hummon on his 1995 album All in Good Time. It was later covered by Tim McGraw, whose version is the fourth single from his 1997 album Everywhere. It peaked at number two in the United States, and number one in Canada.

Content
This song portrays the message of self-forgiveness by explaining three separate incidents as examples.

The song's narrator first reflects on his admitted bullying of a child who was physically different from him and other children who attended the same elementary school.

The narrator secondly reflects on a relationship with a significant other in high school which he abruptly ends as a result of his senseless self-pleasure, inflicting severe emotional abuse to his significant other in the process.

The narrator finally reveals that the hurt that he caused to the people he had previously mentioned in the song eventually stemmed into a deep loathing of himself.

Track listing
Cassette single	
A1 - One Of These Days
A2 - Just To See You Smile
B1 - One Of These Days
B2 - Just To See You Smile

Critical reception
Kevin John Coyne of Country Universe gave the song an A grade, saying that if you are "looking to close a three act song with a dramatic resolution, 'born again' is the way to go."

Music video
The music video for McGraw's rendition was directed and produced by Sherman Halsey, and premiered on CMT on March 23, 1998, when CMT named it a "Hot Shot". It shows McGraw singing the song in a church, as well as a mirrored room, where several McGraws are seen in the same shot.

Chart positions
"One of These Days" debuted at number 73 on the U.S. Billboard Hot Country Singles & Tracks for the week of March 14, 1998.

Year-end charts

References

1998 singles
1997 songs
Tim McGraw songs
Song recordings produced by Byron Gallimore
Song recordings produced by James Stroud
Songs written by Marcus Hummon
Music videos directed by Sherman Halsey
Country ballads
Songs written by Monty Powell
Curb Records singles